Ħondoq ir-Rummien, the coastline below the village of Qala, Gozo, Malta is dotted with traditional salt pans, some of which are still actively used to harvest salt throughout the summer months. On this coast is a small cove, Ħondoq ir-Rummien (which in English means, Pomegranate Moat), which is used by snorkelers because of its deep and clear water and the small caves at sea level. Access to the sea is from bathing ladders. The cove has a view of Comino. There is also a small white sand beach sheltered by a small promontory on the southwest side.

Ħondoq ir-Rummien, a coastal area and bay in Qala, is one of the few remaining tracts of open countryside left in the Maltese Islands. The sea in this area has some of the cleanest and clearest water in all of Malta and Gozo, attracting locals and divers alike. The area is also a habitat for dwindling communities of rare plants.

Ħondoq ir-Rummien, in the area stretching from the depth of the quarry and eastwards along the rocky cliffside, is now being threatened by a proposed development plan to build a five star hotel catering for 170 beds, approximately 25 self-catering villas, 60 self-catering units, 200 multi-ownership residences, 731 underground parking spaces, 10 retail units, 5 dining facilities and a marina for between 100 and 150 craft depending on the size of the vessels.

At Ħondoq-ir-Rummien, there still is the sea-water distillation plant, which was constructed there in the 1960s against the will of Gozitans and at significant expense by the then Nationalist Government. The plant was never finished due to a change in Government in 1971, and has remained in total disuse ever since.

External links 
 Photos and Info

Coasts

Geography of Malta
Qala, Malta
Beaches of Malta